Ganam Courtar Avargale is a 1988 Indian Tamil-language film written and directed by Manivannan. The film stars Sathyaraj and Ambika. It was released on 20 May 1988.

Plot 

Jayabhaskar "Bhaski", an aspiring lawyer, works under veteran lawyer Desikachari as assistant and becomes close to his family. Things change when Desikachari becomes involved in a murder case.

Cast 
 Sathyaraj as Jayabhaskar ("Baski")
 Ambika as Seetha
 S. S. Chandran as Desikachari
 Srividya as Pankajam ("Paki")
 Silk Smitha as Nirosha (Desikachari's client)
 Janagaraj as Baski's mentor
 Captain Raju
 Pratap Pothen
 Vagai Chandrasekhar as Nirosha's brother

Production 
Ganam Courtar Avargale was written and directed by Manivannan, and produced by his wife Sengamalam under Kamala Jothi Combines. Cinematography was handled by A. Sabapathy, and editing by A. Gowthaman. While filming a court scene, Sathyaraj played 13 different roles, taking inspiration from Sivaji Ganesan playing nine roles in Navarathri (1964).

Soundtrack 
The soundtrack was composed by Devendran. The song "Yaaritta Sattam" has an instrumental version, with R. Chandrasekar playing the guitar.

Release and reception 
Ganam Courtar Avargale was released on 20 May 1988. N. Krishnaswamy of The Indian Express positively reviewed the film for Manivannan's "stylish" direction and Sathyaraj's performance. Jeyamanmadhan of Kalki felt that, post-interval, the screenplay could have been a little smarter. The film was commercially successful.

References

External links 
 

1980s comedy thriller films
1980s Tamil-language films
Films directed by Manivannan
Films scored by Devendran
Indian comedy thriller films
Indian courtroom films